Aurora H. C. Phelps (1839 – 4 January 1876) was an American land reformer, labor organizer and leader, and women's rights advocate.

Early life
She was born in Cortland, New York, to John and Aurilla Phelps, and grew up in Elmira where she became a Baptist.

She founded the Boston Working Women's League with Jennie Collins and Elizabeth L. Daniels.

References

Further reading
 

1839 births
1876 deaths
Land reform
American women's rights activists
American women trade unionists
Trade unionists from Massachusetts
People from Cortland, New York